The UEFA European Under-18 Championship 1963 Final Tournament was held in England. It was considered to be the 16th International Youth Football Tournament.

It was hosted by England as part of the Football Association's centenary celebration.

Qualification

|}

|}

Teams
The following teams qualified for the tournament:

 
 
  (received Bye for qualifying stage)
  (qualified as host)
 
 
 
 
 
 
 
  (qualified as cup holders)
  (received Bye for qualifying stage)
  (received Bye for qualifying stage)
 
  (received Bye for qualifying stage)

 also received a Bye for the qualifying stage but withdrew before the start of the tournament. After this, a Bye was given to both  and the  who were drawn against each other for the qualifying stage.

Group stage

Group A

Group B

Group C

Group D

Semifinals

Third place match

Final

External links
Results by RSSSF

UEFA European Under-19 Championship
1963
Under-18
Under-18
1962
UEFA European Under-18 Championship
1963 in youth association football